Marcel Gaudion (12 January 1924 – 23 April 2021) was a French handball player. He was born in Gagny, French Third Republic.

National team 
He was part of the first game of the French national Field handball team on 12 May 1946 against Luxembourg. He played at the 1952 IHF World Men's Outdoor Handball Championship in Switzerland.

Indoor he played 7 games where he was always the Captain of the team. He played at the 1954 World Men's Handball Championship.

Club 
At the club level he played for Villemomble Sports. He had a big regret that he was not able to share the 1945 French title with his youth friends Robert Hébert and Henri Girard who died during the Liberation of Paris. 1952-53 he was handball of the year in France.

 Field handball
 7 French cup winner: 1945, 1946, 1949, 1950, 1951, 1952, 1953
 ? French cup runner-up: 1943
 2 French champions: 1945, 1949
 ? Paris championship runner-up:1943-44, 1945
 Indoor handball
 1 French champion: 1953

Other sports 
Besides handball he was sportive in many sports including track and field, Cyclo-cross and Basketball:
3 place French cadet championship in triathlon
Finalist French cadet championship in Cyclo-cross
3 place Paris junior championship in Shot put

References

1924 births
2021 deaths
French male handball players
Sportspeople from Seine-Saint-Denis
People from Gagny